Persami (stands for Persatuan Sepakbola Maumere Indonesia) is an Indonesian football club based in Gelora Samador Stadium, Maumere, Sikka Regency, East Nusa Tenggara. This team competes in Liga 3 East Nusa Tenggara Zone.

Supporters
 
The supporters of Persami Maumere are Persami Mania who are generally based in Sikka Regency and the surrounding areas.

References

External links

Sikka Regency
Football clubs in Indonesia
Football clubs in East Nusa Tenggara
Association football clubs established in 1958
1958 establishments in Indonesia